Elena Alexandrovna Likhovtseva (born 8 September 1975) is a Kazakhstani-born Russian former tennis player. She turned professional in January 1992, at the age of 16.

Together with Mahesh Bhupathi she won the Wimbledon mixed-doubles championship in 2002, and the Australian Open mixed-doubles championship with Daniel Nestor in 2007.

She also was runner-up in a number of other contests, including the Australian Open women's doubles event in 2004, French Open women's doubles in 2004 and mixed doubles in 2003, and the 2000 and 2004 US Open women's doubles. In the 2004 Summer Olympics, she won the first round of the women's doubles competition with partner Svetlana Kuznetsova, but was defeated in the second.

Grand Slam finals

Women's doubles: 4 (0–4)

Mixed doubles: 5 (2–3)

WTA career finals

Singles: 8 (3–5)

Doubles: 56 (27–29)

ITF Circuit finals

Singles: 4 (2–2)

Doubles: 9 (6–3)

Grand Slam performance timelines

Singles

Doubles

Mixed doubles

Head-vs.-head record
 Steffi Graf 0–3
 Dominique Monami 5–5
 Kim Clijsters 1–3
 Justine Henin 0–3
 Serena Williams 1–4
 Lindsay Davenport 0–10
 Martina Hingis 0–8
 Venus Williams 0–9
 Arantxa Sánchez Vicario 4–5
 Nadia Petrova 3–4
 Dinara Safina 1–1
 Maria Sharapova 1–3

References

External links
 
 
 

1975 births
Hopman Cup competitors
Living people
Olympic tennis players of Russia
Sportspeople from Almaty
Tennis players from Moscow
Russian female tennis players
Tennis players at the 1996 Summer Olympics
Tennis players at the 2000 Summer Olympics
Tennis players at the 2004 Summer Olympics
Grand Slam (tennis) champions in mixed doubles
Tennis commentators
Australian Open (tennis) champions
Wimbledon champions